Tangmoen Idrettslag is a Norwegian association football club from Stjørdal, Nord-Trøndelag.

The club was founded in 1978. The men's football team currently plays in the 3. divisjon, the third tier of Norwegian football, since 2012. It also had a previous stint from 2009 to 2010.

References

Official site 

Football clubs in Norway
Association football clubs established in 1978
Sport in Trøndelag
Stjørdal
1978 establishments in Norway